Sunny Suwanmethanont (born May 18, 1981) is a Thai actor and model. He is best known for his leading role as Khaiyoi in the 2005 film Dear Dakanda, for which he won the Best Actor award at Kom Chad Luek Awards. He is also best known for his roles in I Fine..Thank You..Love You (2014), Heart Attack (2015), Brother of the Year (2018) and Happy Old Year (2019).

Early life and education
Born in Thailand, to a Thai Singaporean father and a French mother. He has one older brother and one older sister. Suwanmethanont attended Surasakmontree School in Bangkok from standard 1 until 6 and graduated from Assumption University, majoring in Communication Arts. He also is an atheist.

Filmography

Film

Television

Awards and nominations

Advertisement
 Est Cola
 TCB Tuna
 Chang Beer
 KTC I-Cash
 AIS Mobile Life
 Hanami Snack
 Colgate
 Yamaha Fino
 Sansiri Townhouse

References

External links
 
 
 

1981 births
Living people
Sunny Suwanmethanont
Sunny Suwanmethanont
Sunny Suwanmethanont
Sunny Suwanmethanont
Sunny Suwanmethanont
Sunny Suwanmethanont
Sunny Suwanmethanont
Former Roman Catholics
Sunny Suwanmethanont
Sunny Suwanmethanont
Sunny Suwanmethanont